The Cary station is a historic structure in the Ledgewood section of Roxbury Township in Morris County. The building's earliest section was built in 1790, and an addition was built in 1890. In 1876, a station of the Central Railroad of New Jersey's High Bridge Branch was established on the property. The structure was added to the National Register of Historic Places on September 5, 1985, as Cary Station.

See also
National Register of Historic Places listings in Morris County, New Jersey

References

Roxbury Township, New Jersey
Houses on the National Register of Historic Places in New Jersey
Gothic Revival architecture in New Jersey
Houses in Morris County, New Jersey
Railway stations on the National Register of Historic Places in New Jersey
Former railway stations in New Jersey
Former Central Railroad of New Jersey stations
National Register of Historic Places in Morris County, New Jersey
New Jersey Register of Historic Places
Railway stations closed in 1932